Major Charles John Morris  (1895 – 13 December 1980) was a British mountaineer, anthropologist and journalist, and controller of BBC Radio's Third Programme.

Life 
Morris served in the army from 1915 to 1934. After serving in the trenches during the First World War, he transferred to the Indian Army's 3rd Gurkha Rifles. He took part in two attempts to climb Mount Everest; the first under General Charles Granville Bruce and climbing leader Lt-Col Edward Lisle Strutt in 1924, and the second in 1936 under Hugh Ruttledge. On the latter, his personal servant was Tenzing Norgay, who made the first ascent of Mount Everest with Edmund Hillary in 1953.

He received an award from the Royal Geographical Society for his exploration of Chinese Turkistan, while still in the army. He retired from military service in the mid 1930s and taught English in Japan. He was Professor of English Literature, Keio University and lecturer at Imperial and Bunrika Universities, Tokyo from 1938 and also adviser on the English language to Japan's Dept. of Foreign affairs. He was repatriated by the Diplomatic corps after Japan's entry into the Second World War and joined the BBC, running their Far East service.

Morris was head of the BBC Far Eastern Service 1943–1952, and controller for the BBC Third Programme 1952–1958. From February 1943 to October 1943 he worked in the same department as George Orwell, at 200 Oxford Street. He wrote an article about Orwell, "Some are more equal than others", for Penguin New Writing Number 40, September 1950 which was reprinted in Orwell Remembered with the title "That Curiously Crucified Expression":

Stephen Spender described Morris in his Journals as:

He was made a Commander of the Order of the British Empire in the 1957 New Year Honours, and appeared as a castaway on the BBC Radio programme Desert Island Discs on 16 February 1959.

Bibliography

Further reading

References

External links 
 archive of Morris ephemera

1895 births
1980 deaths
Indian Army personnel of World War I
British mountain climbers
British male journalists
Mount Everest
Royal Leicestershire Regiment officers
British Army personnel of World War I
British Indian Army officers
BBC Radio 3 controllers
Gurkhas
Commanders of the Order of the British Empire
London Regiment soldiers